Cuyutlán is a  town in the Mexican state of Colima, on the Pacific Ocean. Cuyutlán belongs to the municipality of Armería. There is also a Lagoon of Cuyutlán, which belongs to Armería and Manzanillo, the main Mexican harbour on the Pacific Ocean. Sea salt is produced there and has been since pre Columbian times.

Populated places in Colima